Uamh Bheag is a hill in the Glen Artney Hills range immediately south of the Highland Boundary Fault, part of the Central Lowlands of Scotland. The highest hill of the range, the summit is twin-topped; the lower east top has a trig point. Until 2017, it was not certain which hill was higher, and subsequently which was the Donald and Graham. That year, a survey was conducted which proved the west top to be approximately 2.4m higher. The true summit is currently marked with a cairn and a face carved out of a wooden fencepost, extending from it. It is normally ascended with neighbouring Beinn nan Eun from Glen Artney itself.

Subsidiary SMC Summits

References

Mountains and hills of Perth and Kinross
Mountains and hills of Stirling (council area)
Marilyns of Scotland
Grahams
Donald mountains
Kilmadock